The Institute of Secretariat Training and Management, (acronym ISTM), is a Central Training Institute for civil employees, directly managed by the Department of Personnel and Training, under the Ministry of Personnel, Public Grievances and Pensions, Government of India.

The Institute is headed by Director, who is a career civil servant of the rank of Joint Secretary to Government of India.

History
The Central Secretariat Training School was established by Ministry of Home Affairs in 1948 with the primary objective to provide training to the officers of the Central Secretariat Service (CSS), Central Secretariat Stenographers Service (CSSS) and officers of other subsidiary services based at the Central Secretariat like Railway Board Secretariat Service.

In year 1971, it was renamed as Institute of Secretariat Training and Management and the mandate was expanded to include officers of the State Governments, Union Territory Administrations, Central Public Sector Enterprises, Central Autonomous Bodies and other organizations in specialized and general areas and was renamed the Institute of Secretariat Training and Management. Presently, ISTM is the nodal agency for providing orientation training to all central government employees.

The Institute also provides consultancy services, undertakes research studies and help develop trainers and training techniques. Further, it also holds regular seminars for SAARC and Commonwealth countries.

Facilities

Faculty: ISTM has an approved strength of 29 faculty members, on deputation from various government services who are provided training under different courses such as Trainers Courses, like, Direct Trainer Skills (DTS) and Design of Training (DOT) before they assume their responsibilities. The Institute also invites university professors, experts and administrators as guest faculty, from time to time, for special training modules.

Campus: ISTM campus consists of four buildings, Administrative Block, Hexagon (Seminar Halls) Complex, Library Building, and Hostel Block, each dedicated for a specific purpose. The Administrative Block houses all the offices of the Institute and a committee room whereas the Hexagon Complex, holds 8 seminar rooms, 2 conference halls and 2 auditoria.

Computers and Computer Laboratory: The Institute is equipped with a computer centre which manages the 130 node LAN network, cyber facility which connects the Administrative block, Library and Hostel complex.

Library: The library has a collection of 18,500 reference books and 23,600 instruction manuals and subscribes to many national and international magazines, journals, periodicals and dailies. It also houses 4 classrooms, each accommodating 130 trainees.

ISTM also has an 80-room hostel facility aimed at outstation trainees.

Courses
ISTM has put in place various training programs, on a variety of subjects, such as CSS/CSSS Cadre Training Plan, programs on Management development, Financial management, RTI-Capacity building and Behavioural training, Secretarial / CSSS training, Computer courses and Trainers' development programs.

Publications
ISTM has brought our several handbooks, guides and reference material for use in training programs.
 Handbook for Personnel Officers - 2013 
 Modified Assured Career Progression (MACP) - A Study 
 Handbook for Inquiry Officers and Disciplinary Aut 
 Fundamental Rules & Supplementary Rules 
 Constitution of India 
 ADR Reading Material 
 SDR Reading Material 
 Orientation Training Program - Phase 1 
 Orientation Training Program - Phase 2 
 CBPR Poverty Alleviation

Administration

List of directors

See also

 Central Secretariat Service
 Railway Board Secretariat Service

References

External links
 Institute of Secretariat Training and Management
 Department of Personnel and Training
 on Wikimapia
 on Govt of India site
 ICAR notification on training
 Profile on Government of India web site

News and further reading
 Union Budget allocates money for training babus by NDTV Profit
 Government launches e-service record book portal by The Hindu
 Govt opens learning resource centre for training of babus by The Free Press Journal.

Government agencies of India
Ministry of Personnel, Public Grievances and Pensions
Training organisations in India